Matthew Arnold Thiessen (born August 12, 1980) is a Canadian-American musician, singer, songwriter, and record producer known for being co-founder, lead singer, guitarist, pianist, and primary songwriter for the Christian rock band Relient K. With Relient K, he has released eight full-length albums, including three that were certified Gold, and three that peaked in the top twenty on the Billboard 200. Outside of his work with Relient K, Thiessen leads a side project called Matthew Thiessen and the Earthquakes, which released its debut album Wind Up Bird on August 31, 2018. In 2009, he co-produced and collaborated on Owl City's album Ocean Eyes.

Musical career

Relient K

Thiessen founded Relient K in 1998, with guitarist Matt Hoopes, and bassist Brian Pittman, and recorded the demo All Work & No Play the same year.  The recording attracted the interest of Toby McKeehan who signed the band to his label Gotee Records.  Between the years 2000 and 2003, Gotee released three full-length albums, one Christmas album, and four EPs with Relient K.  In 2004, their fourth album Mmhmm was released on both Capitol Records and Gotee, and peaked at number fifteen on the Billboard 200.  After recording another EP in 2005, Mmhmm and Two Lefts Don't Make a Right...but Three Do, their 2003 album, were certified gold, followed by their 2001 album The Anatomy of the Tongue in Cheek in 2006.  In 2007, Gotee, Capitol, and EMI released Relient K's fifth studio album, Five Score and Seven Years Ago, which peaked at number six on the Billboard 200.  After the release of the double EP The Bird and the Bee Sides in 2008, the band signed with Gotee's Mono Vs. Stereo imprint, on which they released their sixth studio album, Forget and Not Slow Down, again reaching the top twenty of the Billboard 200.  Thiessen and the other members of Relient K have taken up A&R positions for the label as part of the record deal.

Thiessen has been the lead vocalist, frontman, guitarist, primary songwriter, and, along with guitarist/backing vocalist Matt Hoopes, the only member who has been in the band for its entire history. Because of this position of musical leader, he maintains the most creative and artistic control of the band members. He has also served as co-producer on several occasions as well. As the band matured musically, Thiessen started being credited with piano in most releases, beginning with The Anatomy of the Tongue in Cheek in 2001.  Since the release of Mmhmm in 2004, his piano playing started becoming more prominent, and he began including a piano onstage as well.

Solo projects and collaborations
In addition to being in Relient K, Thiessen plays in his own solo piano project called Matthew Thiessen and the Earthquakes. Prior to 2018, the project had released a total of five songs on various samplers and compilation albums from Gotee and Mono Vs. Stereo, and several songs written for the project have been re-recorded on Relient K releases.  In 2010, after the release and supporting tour of Forget and Not Slow Down, Thiessen announced that he would begin work on a full-length solo album. Although he had previously expressed interest in recording a studio release, he had placed his priority on Relient K, and relegated his solo work to his free time.

In April 2018, Adam Young of Owl City announced that Matthew Thiessen and the Earthquakes would be joining them on tour later in the year. In June 2018, Thiessen announced that his debut album under Matthew Thiessen and the Earthquakes, Wind Up Bird, would release later that summer.

Thiessen has occasionally collaborated with Jon Foreman of Switchfoot.  After initial interest in recording vocals for a Switchfoot song, it instead worked out for Foreman to contribute vocals for the Relient K song "Deathbed" from Five Score and Seven Years Ago. He later contributed songwriting and vocals to the Switchfoot release "Rebuild" in 2007, in conjunction for the Appetite for Construction Tour.

In 2009, he contributed vocals, songwriting, and production to Owl City's major-label debut Ocean Eyes, which has sold over 1,500,000 copies worldwide and reached the top ten on the Billboard 200.  Lead single "Fireflies" reached number one on the Billboard Hot 100 in late October, and was a global success, topping the charts in many countries including Australia, Denmark, the Netherlands, and the United Kingdom. Thiessen continues to work with Owl City's Adam Young and contributes vocals to "Plant Life", a song on the album, "All Things Bright and Beautiful". He also co-wrote "Good Time" with Owl City and Brian Lee. Thiessen has also made guest contributions on a number of releases with other artists, including Blackbear, John Reuben, tobyMac and The Fold.

Musical style and influences

Thiessen has received piano lessons since he was seven years old, with early interests in ragtime and Scott Joplin, specifically the soundtrack from The Sting. He taught himself guitar at the age of fourteen by learning to play songs by grunge bands like Silverchair and Nirvana. Thiessen does not use guitar picks while playing; he instead uses his thumb. According to Matt Hoopes, this is because he can't. Since Relient K's early days, Thiessen's main influences have been in the pop punk genre, specifically NOFX, Less Than Jake, Ghoti Hook, MxPx, and Goldfinger. He later introduced influences from Simon & Garfunkel, Ben Folds, and The Beach Boys, who he has named as his favorite band.  Thiessen has claimed that after years of writing and performing pop-punk songs, he now finds writing slower music more enjoyable.  He has described his Matt Thiessen and the Earthquakes side project as being influenced by Rufus Wainwright and Ben Folds.

Guitars
Though he has played several guitars throughout his career, Thiessen is best known for playing Gibson ES-335s and has also been seen playing a Gibson Tom DeLonge Signature ES-333 occasionally.

Personal life
Thiessen was born in St. Catharines, Ontario. His parents divorced when he was six years old and living in Stevensville, Ontario. Later, his mother remarried and the family moved to Bolivar, Ohio, where he met and befriended future bandmates Matt Hoopes and Brian Pittman. The three have said that they have known each other since first or second grade.

Thiessen dated future pop star Katy Perry for a time from 2003 until 2005, and wrote several songs with her and Glen Ballard during her early recording sessions.  One of the songs the three wrote, "Long Shot", would go on to be recorded by Kelly Clarkson on her 2009 album All I Ever Wanted. Remaining on good terms with Perry, he also co-wrote "Dressin' Up from Teenage Dream: The Complete Confection.

In 2008, it was announced that Thiessen proposed to Shannon Murphy, a morning radio co-host of the "Mojo in the Morning" show based in Detroit. The couple planned for an August 22, 2009 wedding. However, the engagement was terminated in December, after Murphy claimed that Thiessen had been unfaithful.

Thiessen married Emily Wright on August 23, 2015 in New York City, with Matt Hoopes as his best man. They kept the engagement and marriage a secret from the public. The couple divorced in February 2018.

Solo discography

Studio Albums (as Matthew Thiessen and the Earthquakes)

Compilation appearances (as Matthew Thiessen and the Earthquakes)

Collaborations

References 

1980 births
American performers of Christian music
American male singers
American rock guitarists
American male guitarists
American rock singers
American people of Canadian descent
Canadian Christians
Canadian expatriate musicians in the United States
Canadian male guitarists
Canadian male singers
Canadian performers of Christian music
Canadian rock pianists
Living people
Singers from Ohio
Musicians from St. Catharines
Musicians from Canton, Ohio
People from Tuscarawas County, Ohio
Relient K members
Annie Award winners
Guitarists from Ohio
Canadian male pianists
21st-century American male singers
21st-century American singers
21st-century Canadian male singers